David Hamilton Jackson (September 28, 1884 – May 30, 1946) was a labor rights advocate in the Danish West Indies, later the United States Virgin Islands. Jackson was an important figure in the struggle for increased civil rights and workers' rights on the islands. He petitioned for freedom of the press, and organized the islands' first trade union. Following the transfer of the territory to American control in 1917, he lobbied for US citizenship for the islanders.

Life and career
Jackson worked as an educator and later a bookkeeper and clerk before becoming involved in the politics of the Danish West Indies. He traveled to Denmark and successfully petitioned for the repeal of a 1779 law which prohibited independent newspapers and enforced strict censorship on all publications in the territory. Upon returning home, he established the first free newspaper, The Herald. The date of this event, November 1, is celebrated as an annual public holiday known as "Liberty Day", D. Hamilton Jackson Day, or Bull and Bread Day in the U.S. Virgin Islands.

With the help of Ralph Bough, Jackson organized the first union in the Danish West Indies, St. Croix Labor Union, in 1913. He lobbied for the transfer of the islands to American control. After his visit, a majority of the Folketing was convinced that Danish rule over the islands should be ended.

A residential community in Christiansted has been named in his honour.

See also
 1878 St. Croix Labor Riots

References

Sources
St. Croix Public School: D. Hamilton Jackson Biography
https://web.archive.org/web/20160310145643/http://www.virgin-islands-history.org/en/fates/d-hamilton-jackson-rebel-and-hero/
https://web.archive.org/web/20151210111349/http://webpac.uvi.edu/imls/pi_uvi/profiles1972/Judges_Attorneys/Jackson_DH/text.shtml

External links
 "The Herald" issues openly online in the Digital Library of the Caribbean

1884 births
1946 deaths
American civil rights activists
American trade union leaders
United States Virgin Islands activists
People from Saint Croix, U.S. Virgin Islands
People from the Danish West Indies
Danish trade union leaders
Labor in the Caribbean